Cancricepon elegans is a species of isopods that parasitises the crab Pilumnus hirtellus. It was originally described from French waters and has since been found off the coast of Great Britain.

References

Cymothoida
Parasitic crustaceans
Parasites of crustaceans
Crustaceans of the Atlantic Ocean
Crustaceans described in 1887